Hanggang sa Dulo ng Buhay Ko (International title: Obsession / ) is a 2019 Philippine television drama horror series broadcast by GMA Network. It premiered on the network's Afternoon Prime and Sabado Star Power sa Hapon line up and worldwide on GMA Pinoy TV on July 22, 2019, replacing Dragon Lady.

Series overview

Episodes

July 2019

August 2019

September 2019

October 2019

References

Lists of Philippine drama television series episodes